Rok Mordej (born 3 March 1989) is a Slovenian futsal player who plays for Dobovec and the Slovenian national futsal team.

References

External links
NZS profile 

1989 births
Living people
Slovenian men's futsal players
Futsal defenders
Slovenian expatriate sportspeople in Italy
Slovenian expatriate sportspeople in Croatia